Klei Entertainment Inc. is a Canadian video game development company located in Vancouver, British Columbia. Klei was formed in July 2005 by Jamie Cheng. Their best-known titles include Don't Starve and Oxygen Not Included. On January 25, 2021, Klei became a subsidiary of the Chinese holding conglomerate Tencent.

History 
Jamie Cheng founded Klei Entertainment in July 2005. Prior to the formation of Klei, Cheng worked as a specialist AI programmer at Relic Entertainment, then owned by THQ. Cheng acquired seed funding for Klei by selling his THQ shares earned at Relic and getting a $10,000 loan from his brother.With the initial funding secured, Jamie partnered with Jeffrey Agala to become Co-Founder and Creative Director at the studio. Jeffrey brings a unique blend of 2d animation and comic book aesthetics that have become a signature of the games developed by Klei. In 2009 Klei had 11 employees and as of May 2013 has grown to 35 employees.

Their first title, Eets was first released March 27, 2006, for Microsoft Windows, then for Mac OS X on December 9, 2010. Between those two releases the game was ported to the Xbox 360 via the Xbox Live Arcade platform and released on April 25, 2007.  Retitled Eets: Chowdown, this version featured 120 new levels and an action minigame called Marsho Madness.

The company assisted with Slick Entertainment's N+, the Xbox Live Arcade port of the Adobe Flash game N.  In 2008 Klei developed Sugar Rush, a casual massively multiplayer online game.  They announced in late August 2010, that development had stopped and the game was canceled.  The company's fourth original title, Shank,  was announced at Penny Arcade Expo 2009.  It was released on August 24, 2010, for the PlayStation 3, August 25, 2010, for the Xbox 360 and October 26, 2010, on for Microsoft Windows.

Klei's survival adventure game Don't Starve was released on April 23, 2013. Don't Starve was released in a 2-for-1 beta format on Steam, allowing players to purchase two copies of the game for the price of one. Before being officially self-published, Klei sold more than 300,000 copies of Don't Starve at $15 each. On April 21, 2016, Klei released a stand-alone multiplayer version of Don't Starve called Don't Starve Together, which has regular updates and individual downloadable content.

On July 2, 2013, it was announced that their next release would to be titled Invisible, Inc., a turn-based espionage game released on May 12, 2015.

In 2017, Klei Entertainment acquired Slick Entertainment. Slick founder Nick Waanders and Jamie Cheng previously worked together at Relic Entertainment, which established a working relationship that later allowed the companies to merge.

Klei announced in January 2021 that they had agreed for Tencent to acquire a majority stake in the company. Klei would remain in full control of its products, but the Tencent acquisition would help them to reach into the gaming market in China.

Culture 
Co-founder Jamie Cheng sought a company culture where employees live balanced lives. He built Klei with the theory that game studios can make popular, interesting games with a reasonable budget on normal hours at a fair price and still be successful. Since then, Klei has gained a reputation in the video game industry as a successful studio that treats its employees well and maintains balance.

Games developed

References

External links 

Companies based in Vancouver
Canadian companies established in 2005
Video game companies established in 2005
Video game companies of Canada
Video game development companies
2005 establishments in British Columbia
Tencent divisions and subsidiaries
Canadian subsidiaries of foreign companies
2021 mergers and acquisitions